Priest is a 2011 American action horror film directed by Scott Stewart and stars Paul Bettany as the title character. It is loosely based on the Korean comic of the same name by Hyung Min-woo. In an alternate universe, humanity and vampires have warred for centuries. After the last Vampire War, a veteran Warrior Priest lives in obscurity until his niece (Lily Collins) is kidnapped by vampires.

The film earned over $78 million at the box office against a $60 million production budget, but it was panned by critics, who praised the film's visual style and art direction while criticizing the movie's use of genre clichés, writing, acting, editing and action scenes.

Plot
A centuries-long war between humans and vampires has devastated the planet's surface and led to a theocracy under an organization called The Church. Despite the vampires' vulnerability to sunlight, and all of mankind's technological advances, the vampires' greater strength and speed made them impossible to defeat until humanity sheltered themselves in giant walled cities and trained a group of elite warriors, the Priests, which turned the tide.

In the opening scene, a group of Priests enters the Sola Mira Hive but are ambushed by the vampires.  As they attempt to retreat, one of their numbers is seized from behind, and their leader tries to pull him to safety, but is forced to let go and watch him dragged, screaming, back into the hive.

Years later, the majority of the vampires have been killed, while the remainder were placed in reservations. With the war over, the Clergy disbanded the Priests. Outside the walled cities, some humans seek out a living, free from the totalitarian control of The Church.

Priest (Paul Bettany) is approached by Hicks (Cam Gigandet), the sheriff of a free town, Augustine. Priest learns that his brother, Owen, and Owen's wife, Shannon—Priest's girlfriend before he was recruited by the clergy—were mortally wounded in a vampire attack, and Priest's niece, Lucy (Lily Collins), was kidnapped. Hicks asks for Priest's help in rescuing Lucy. Priest asks the Church to reinstate his authority, but leader Monsignor Orelas (Christopher Plummer) does not believe the vampire story and refuses, insisting on maintaining the common belief that the vampires have been completely defeated, for fear of compromising the Church's authority. Priest defiantly leaves the city and Orelas sends three Priests and a Priestess (Maggie Q) to bring him back.

Priest and Hicks arrive at Nightshade Reservation where humans called Familiars, people infected with a pathogen that makes them subservient to the vampires, live alongside a number of the surviving vampires. After a fierce battle, the pair discovers that most of the vampires have taken shelter in Sola Mira, which was thought to have been abandoned after the war. Priestess, one of Priest's team during the failed attack on the Hive, joins them at Sola Mira. The trio destroys a Hive Guardian vampire, then discover that the vampires have bred a new army and dug a tunnel out of the mountain towards a town called Jericho. The other three Priests have arrived at Jericho just as night falls and an armored train arrives, unleashing hundreds of vampires upon the population. The vampires are led by a powerful and mysterious human wearing a black hat (Karl Urban). When the three Priests reject Black Hat's offer to join him, he kills them all.

The next morning, Priest, Priestess and Hicks arrive in Jericho and discover the town empty and the three dead Priests crucified. Priest and Priestess share an intimate moment when she confesses her feelings for him, hoping that now that Shannon has died, he would no longer feel bound to her. Priest gently refuses. Priest realizes that the vampires have been using the trains to travel by day and attack the free towns by night, with the walled cities at the end of the train line. Hicks believes the cities are likewise protected by the sun, but Priest explains that the cities' massive clouds of smoke and ash have permanently deprived them of sunlight.  If the train reaches one of the cities, the attack will be a slaughter.

Hicks, who is in love with Lucy, threatens Priest, believing that Priest intends to kill her if she has been infected by the vampires.  Priestess explains that he cannot do so, because Lucy is actually Priest's daughter, and that Owen stepped in as a husband and a father when Priest was taken by the Church.  Lucy was never told the truth about her parentage.

While Priestess rushes ahead to plant a bomb on the railroad tracks, Priest and Hicks board the train to rescue Lucy. Battling vampires and Familiars, the two are finally overpowered by Black Hat just as they find Lucy. Black Hat is revealed as the priest who was lost in the attack on Sola Mira.  After being captured, the vampire Queen gave him her blood, turning him into the first Vampire-Human hybrid who can survive the sun. As Priest fights Black Hat, Lucy discovers the truth about her parentage. On the tracks ahead of the train, Priestess battles several Familiars, but one of them destroys the detonator for the explosives.  Instead, she mounts the explosives on her motor bike and drives it into the train engine. The explosion and subsequent derailment kills the vampires and engulfs Black Hat in flames, while Hicks, Priest, Priestess, and Lucy are able to escape.

Priest returns to the city and confronts Monsignor Orelas during Mass, telling him of the burnt train containing the vampires' bodies, but not the Queen's. He proves this by throwing a vampire head onto the floor and shocking everyone in the room. Orelas still refuses to believe him, declaring that the war is over, while Priest says that it is just beginning. Outside the city Priest meets Priestess, who confirms that other Priests have been notified and will meet them at a rendezvous point. Priest sets off into the sunset.

Cast
 Paul Bettany as Priest
 Karl Urban as Black Hat
 Cam Gigandet as Hicks
 Maggie Q as Priestess
 Lily Collins as Lucy Pace
 Brad Dourif as Salesman
 Stephen Moyer as Owen Pace
 Christopher Plummer as Monsignor Orelas
 Alan Dale as Monsignor Chamberlain
 Mädchen Amick as Shannon Pace
 Jacob Hopkins as Boy
 Dave Florek as Crocker
 Joel Polinsky as Dr. Tomlin
 Josh Wingate as Familiar

Production

Priest is directed by Scott Stewart and written by Cory Goodman. The film is based on the supernatural horror and action Korean comics Priest by Min-Woo Hyung.

The project was first announced in March 2005 when the studio Screen Gems bought Goodman's spec script. In January 2006, Andrew Douglas, who directed The Amityville Horror, was attached to direct Priest. Filming did not proceed and, by three years later, director Douglas had been replaced by Stewart, while Butler had been replaced in the starring role by Paul Bettany. Stewart and Bettany had previously worked together in the Screen Gems film Legion.

With a budget of $60 million, filming began in August 2009 in Los Angeles, California, and it concluded in November 2009. The film was the most expensive production from Screen Gems, to that date, and as of 2018 is still tied for third-most expensive, behind only Underworld: Awakening and Resident Evil: Retribution.

Tokyopop flew Min-Woo Hyung to where production was taking place so the comics' creator could visit the art department and discuss the film with Stewart. The film diverges from the comics in following a different timeline of events and adding elements of the sci-fi western, cyberpunk and post-apocalyptic science-fiction genres. The director described Priests vampires as not being human in origin, and humans bitten by vampires became familiars instead. There are different forms of vampires, such as hive drones, guardians, and a queen. Since the vampires were intended to move quickly, they were fully computer-generated for the film. While vampires are harmed by sunlight in most lore, the film's vampires are instead photosensitive, being albino cave-dwellers. Stewart said, "They are the enemy we don't really understand, but we fought them for centuries. They are mysterious and alien, with their own culture. You sense that they think and communicate, but you don't really understand what they are saying." The director also called Priest an homage to The Searchers with the title character being similar to John Wayne's character and the vampires being similar to the Comanche. The animated prologue for the film was created by American animator and director Genndy Tartakovsky.
The production team includes: 
 Michael De Luca
 Josh Bratman
 Shareena Carlson
 Joshua Donen 
 Glenn S. Gainor 
 Steve Galloway 
Stuart J. Levy
 Mitchell Peck
 Nicola Stern

Theatrical release
The film's release date changed numerous times in 2010 and 2011.

It performed poorly in the United Kingdom with under $700,000.

It grossed an estimated  over the weekend, ranking fourth at the box office. Its performance was considered subpar compared to similar films in the Underworld series and Resident Evil series.

Critical reception
Priest was largely panned by critics. Review aggregator Rotten Tomatoes gives the film a score of 15% based on reviews from 101 critics and reports a rating average of 4.00 out of 10 with a consensus that "Priest is admittedly sleek and stylish, but those qualities are wasted on a dull, derivative blend of sci-fi, action, and horror clichés". At Metacritic, which assigns a weighted average score out of 100 to reviews from mainstream critics, the film received an average score of 41 based on 13 reviews, indicating "mixed or average reviews". CinemaScore polls reported that the average grade audiences gave the film was a "C+" on an A+ to F scale.

See also
 Legion, a film also directed by Scott Stewart and starring Paul Bettany.
Vampire films, about vampires in cinema and other films featuring vampires.

References

External links
 
 
 
 

2011 films
2011 3D films
2011 action thriller films
American films with live action and animation
American action horror films
American action thriller films
American horror thriller films
2010s monster movies
Cyberpunk films
American dark fantasy films
American dystopian films
Films based on manhwa
Films directed by Scott Stewart (director)
Films produced by Michael De Luca
Films scored by Christopher Young
Films shot in California
Films shot in Los Angeles
Live-action films based on comics
American post-apocalyptic films
American vampire films
Screen Gems films
2010s English-language films
2010s American films